Kaltenbachiella is a genus of insect belonging to the family Aphididae.

The genus was first described by Schouteden in 1906.

Species:
 Kaltenbachiella pallida

References

Aphididae
Hemiptera genera